Vojin Mijatović (born 1979) is a Bosnian politician who is currently a vice president of the Social Democratic Party since 2019.

Biography 
Mijatović was born to Bosnian Serb parents in 1979 in Banja Luka, SR Bosnia and Herzegovina, SFR Yugoslavia. In 2002 he graduated at the Faculty of Business Studies in Belgrade.

Political career 
He started his career in 2001 at the Ministry for Refugees and Displaced Persons, where he worked as a spokesperson until 2006.

Mijatović joined Milorad Dodik's Alliance of Independent Social Democrats (SNSD) in 2006. The same year he was named the head of the Department for European Integration of the Ministry of Finance of Republika Srpska. In 2008, he became an adviser to the Chairman of the Council of Ministers of Bosnia and Herzegovina. In 2009, he was appointed Assistant Minister of Finance of Republika Srpska for EU pre-accession assistance, and from 2010 to 2013 he worked as an advisor to the President of Republika Srpska for international relations and cooperation with international financial institutions.

From 2014 to 2016, he was the director of the Economic Institute in Banja Luka.

In 2016, Mijatović changed political positions and left SNSD. Following his departure from SNSD he joined the Social Democratic Party (SDP). In 2017, he was appointed vice president of the Main Board of SDP and in July 2019 he was appointed vice president of SDP.

On 10 June 2022, Mijatović announced his candidacy in the Bosnian general election, running for Bosnia's three-person Presidency member, representing the Serbs.

References 

1979 births
Living people
Serbs of Bosnia and Herzegovina
Alliance of Independent Social Democrats politicians
Social Democratic Party of Bosnia and Herzegovina politicians